Pamela Bianca Ramos Manalo (born November 28, 1987) is a Filipina actress and beauty pageant titleholder. She was the Binibining Pilipinas Universe 2009 winner, and represented the Philippines at Miss Universe 2009, but she was unplaced.

In October 2010, she was cast in the ABS-CBN television series Juanita Banana on a title role until the show ended in February 2011. In February 2012, she became the first Asian woman to become an endorser of L'Oreal Matrix.

Family and personal life
Manalo has two American and Filipino bloodlines. She is the sister of Miss World 2002 - Top 10 Finalist Katherine Anne Manalo and Miss Globe 2016 - 3rd Runner-Up Nichole Marie Manalo, and is the niece of Miss International 1968 - Top 15 Semi-Finalist Nini Ramos.

Prior to joining the Binibining Pilipinas pageant, Manalo worked as a flight attendant for the domestic operations of Philippine Airlines. She graduated at Assumption College San Lorenzo with a degree in Advertising.

Filmography

Film

Television

Awards and nominations

References

External links
 Miss Universe profile - from the official Miss Universe website
 Bianca Manalo: Making the World a Better Place - from the official Binibining Pilipinas website
 
 Sparkle profile

1987 births
Living people
Binibining Pilipinas winners
Miss Universe 2009 contestants
Filipino film actresses
21st-century Filipino actresses
Filipino television actresses
People from Parañaque
Actresses from Metro Manila
Filipino people of American descent
Star Magic
ABS-CBN personalities
GMA Network personalities